The Broadsands Chambered Tomb is a Neolithic burial chamber located on a slope overlooking Broadsands Beach. It is listed as a Scheduled Monument by English Heritage and was first listed in 1957.

Description 
The tomb is currently a part of a hedge bank, situated on hilly farmland between Broadsands Beach and the tracks of the Dartmouth Steam Railway. The tomb comprises a megalithic chamber and has a single entrance passageway. It was originally set within a cairn, part of which survives to the present day. During excavations it was found to contain the fragmentary remains of two adults and a child along with pottery shards from the Neolithic era.

References

Further reading 

 The chambered tomb at Broadsands, Paignton. Proceedings of the Devon Archaeological Exploration Society 5 pages 147–66 by Ralegh Radford, 1958.

Neolithic England
Archaeological sites in England
Devon